The Greensboro Generals were a minor league ice hockey team based in Greensboro, North Carolina. Greensboro was part of the Eastern Hockey League from 1959 to 1973, and then played in the Southern Hockey League from 1973 to 1977. The team was founded when the Troy Bruins of the International Hockey League were relocated by owner Ken Wilson and admitted to the EHL, to play in the recently built Greensboro Coliseum.

History
The team was owned by a group of local investors led by Carson Bain, who brought in Roland McLenahan as the team's first coach. The Eastern Hockey League was classified as amateur, although Generals players were recruited and paid. The Generals debut game at the coliseum was a 4–1 victory versus Washington, played on November 11, 1959, in front of a crowd of 3,014. Goaltender Norm Defelice won the George Davis Trophy for the lowest goals against average in the 1959–60 season.

Ronnie Spong took charge of the Generals as player-coach in 1960, and remained in that role until 1971, leading the Generals to a winning record in all but one of those seasons. The Generals reached the championship finals three years in a row from 1962 to 1964, and won the league title in 1963. Centerman Don Davidson won the John Carlin Trophy in the 1963–64 season as the league's scoring champion. The Generals had solid goaltending in the late 1960s with Peter McDuffe winning the EHL Rookie of the Year in 1967–68, and Ernie Miller winning the George Davis Trophy in 1969–70 for the lowest GAA in the EHL. Greensboro returned to the league finals in 1970, but finished as runners-up.

In the spring of 1971, Bain and his partners sold the Generals to Tedd Munchak, owner of the Carolina Cougars of the American Basketball Association. Don Carter became player-coach in 1972, then was replaced by Bob Smith as goaltender and coach in 1973. At the end of the season, the Generals along with three other teams, announced that they would leave the EHL to form the Southern Hockey League.

Ted Lanyon became head coach for the 1973–74 season, but struggled in the new league dropping to third place. The Generals moved to the smaller Piedmont Arena in 1975 due to financial difficulty, and Ronnie Spong returned as head coach. The Generals finished last place in each of the final three seasons of play. On January 4, 1977, the Generals folded mid-season due to continued financial problems. Three other SHL clubs folded the same week, and the league folded on January 31.

Major league affiliations
The Generals were primarily affiliated with the World Hockey Association from 1972 to 1975, but also had secondary National Hockey League affiliations from 1967 to 1977.

Notable players
Notable Greensboro Generals players that also played in the National Hockey League or World Hockey Association:
 

Ron Anderson
Steve Andrascik
Jamie Bateman
Jacques Blain
Kirk Bowman
Don Burgess
Brian Bye
Brian Cadle
Jack Caffery
Jeff Carlson
Lyle Carter
Chick Chalmers
Jack Chipchase
Mike Conroy
Tom Cottringer
Claude Cyr
Murray Davison
Norm Defelice
Brian Derksen
Jerry Engele
John Fisher
Greg Fox
Russ Gillow
Don Gordon
Bruce Greig
Howie Heggedal
Earl Heiskala
Paul Hoganson
Bill Horton
Don Howse
Mike Hyndman
Mike Jakubo
Eddie Johnston
Ed Johnstone
Jim Jones
Doug Kerslake
Jarda Krupicka
Moe L'Abbé
Michel Lachance
Ted Lanyon
Barry Legge
Bernie MacNeil
Peter McDuffe
Jimmy McLeod
Rick Morris
Bob Perreault
Tony Poeta
Jan Popiel
Steve Richardson
Lorne Rombough
Bob Russell
Barry Salovaara
Nick Sanza
Danny Schock
Steve Self
Tom Serviss
Bob Sicinski
Fred Speck
Guy Trottier
Gordon Tumilson
Don Ward
Jim Watson
Steve West
Alton White
Ian Wilkie
Gary Williamson
Hal Willis
Bob Winograd
Roger Wilson
Bill Young
Jerry Zrymiak
Wayne Zuk

Results
Season-by-season results in the EHL and SHL.

References

External links
 The Eastern Hockey League

1959 establishments in North Carolina
1977 disestablishments in North Carolina
Atlanta Flames minor league affiliates
Baltimore Blades minor league affiliates
Chicago Blackhawks minor league affiliates
Cleveland Barons minor league affiliates
Colorado Rockies (NHL) minor league affiliates
Defunct ice hockey teams in the United States
Detroit Red Wings minor league affiliates
Eastern Hockey League teams
Ice hockey clubs established in 1959
Ice hockey clubs disestablished in 1977
Ice hockey teams in North Carolina
Michigan Stags minor league affiliates
New York Islanders minor league affiliates
Southern Hockey League (1973–1977) teams
Sports in Greensboro, North Carolina
Toronto Maple Leafs minor league affiliates
Washington Capitals minor league affiliates